Center Ridge is an unincorporated census-designated place in Conway County, Arkansas, United States. Per the 2020 census, the population was 2,235.

Demographics

2020 census

Note: the US Census treats Hispanic/Latino as an ethnic category. This table excludes Latinos from the racial categories and assigns them to a separate category. Hispanics/Latinos can be of any race.

Education 
Center Ridge is the headquarters of the Nemo Vista School District and home to Nemo Vista High School. The school's mascot is the Redhawks and red and white serve as the school colors.

Notable people 
 Clifton Clowers, subject of the hit song "Wolverton Mountain", by Merle Kilgore and Claude King
 Conlan and John Carter, actors
 Matt Stell, country singer

Catholic Point
To the southeast of Center Ridge is a small Italian settlement named Catholic Point that was founded in the late nineteenth century. It maintains its cultural identity and attracts over 2500 people yearly to its annual church picnic.

References

External links
Wolverton Mountain

Census-designated places in Arkansas
Census-designated places in Conway County, Arkansas
Italian-American culture in Arkansas